"Let's Don't Call It a Night" is a first song co-written and recorded by the American country music singer and American Idol season 9 finalist, Casey James.  It was released in August 2011 as the first single from his album Casey James, released by BNA Records in March 2012. James wrote the song with Terry McBride and Brice Long.

Critical reception
Jeff Lincoln of Country Standard Time said that the song "has a charming, sultry groove. Exchanging sharp Dobro twangs with understatedly suggestive lyrics, it's something Ronnie Milsap may have plucked for himself 30 years ago". Giving it three stars out of five, Billy Dukes of Taste of Country called the opening lyrics "vapid" but praised the chorus, also saying, "The mood is right."

Music video
Roman White directed the music video.

Chart performance

Year-end charts

References

2011 debut singles
2011 songs
Casey James songs
BNA Records singles
Music videos directed by Roman White
Songs written by Brice Long
Songs written by Terry McBride (musician)
Song recordings produced by Chris Lindsey